Peroslav Ferković (26 April 1903 – 11 January 1982) was a Croatian athlete. He competed in the men's decathlon at the 1924 Summer Olympics, representing Yugoslavia.

References

External links
 

1903 births
1982 deaths
Athletes (track and field) at the 1924 Summer Olympics
Croatian decathletes
Olympic athletes of Yugoslavia
Sportspeople from Zagreb
Olympic decathletes